Prostanthera canaliculata is a species of flowering plant in the family Lamiaceae and is endemic to the south-west of Western Australia. It is a small, erect shrub with hairy branchlets, narrow egg-shaped to narrow elliptical leaves and pale blue or pale violet to white flowers with no markings.

Description
Flowering occurs from September to November.

Taxonomy
Prostanthera canaliculata was first formally described in 1868 by Ferdinand von Mueller in his book Fragmenta phytographiae Australiae.

Distribution and habitat
This mintbush grows on sandy rises, sandplains and on granite outcrops in the Avon Wheatbelt, Esperance Plains, Jarrah Forest, Mallee and Swan Coastal Plain biographic regions of Western Australia.

Conservation status
Prostanthera canaliculata is classified as "not threatened" by the Western Australian Government Department of Parks and Wildlife.

References

canaliculata
Flora of Western Australia
Lamiales of Australia
Taxa named by Ferdinand von Mueller
Plants described in 1868